Jakob "Jaka" Avšič (nom de guerre Branko Hrast) (24 April 1896 – 2 January 1978) was the first commander of Chetnik units (Plava garda) in Slovenia during the Second World War. At the end of October 1941, Colonel Avšič and Major Karl Novak went to Ravna Gora and met with Draža Mihailović, who appointed Avšič as his representative in Slovenia. Avšič soon deserted the Yugoslav Royal Army in the Fatherland and joined the communists. He was then instructed by the communist executive board to try to convince other Yugoslav army officers to desert and join the communists. During the war he used the pseudonym Branko Hrast.

References

Sources 

 
 
 

1896 births
1978 deaths
Military personnel from Ljubljana
Chetnik personnel of World War II
Slovenian Chetnik personnel of World War II
Yugoslav Partisans members